Robert James Gardner (1 April 1890 – 12 November 1966) was a member of the Queensland Legislative Assembly.

Biography
Gardner was born in Brisbane, Queensland, the son of William Gardner and his wife Mary Jane (née Murphy). He was educated at the local primary school and after finishing his education became a storekeeper. From 1928 until 1950 he worked as a painter for the State Works Department of Queensland

On 9 April 1913 he married Annie Campbell (died 1986) and together had two sons and four daughters. Gardner died in Brisbane in  November 1966  and was buried in the Hemmant Cemetery.

Public career
Gardner, a member of the Labor Party, won the seat of Bulimba at the 1950 Queensland state election, beating the sitting Independent Labor member, George Marriott  and the Liberal Party candidate, John Hamilton. However, Hamilton appealed the decision and the Acting Chief Justice, Alan Mansfield found that there gross fraud committed in the election. Fake ballot papers had been lodged, and whilst Mansfield did not put any of the blame on Gardner, he ruled the Gardner's election win to be void.

A by-election was held in April 1951, and once again Gardner won the seat. Two days after the by-election, Bernard Maguire, the Chief Electoral Officer, was charged with eight counts of  having forged ballot papers. In September 1951 though, the Crown dropped the case after a jury failed three times to reach a verdict and Maguire was then discharged.

Gardner went on to hold the seat until the 1957 Queensland state election, having sided with Premier Vince Gair to join the newly formed QLP after the ALP had split two months earlier. He was defeated by future Opposition leader, Jack Houston of the ALP. He was a member of the Bulimba Hockey Association, the Australian Natives Association, and Valleys Rugby League Old Boys Association.

References

Members of the Queensland Legislative Assembly
1890 births
1966 deaths
Australian Labor Party members of the Parliament of Queensland
Queensland Labor Party members of the Parliament of Queensland
20th-century Australian politicians